Kalateh-ye Ali Zeynal (also Romanized as Kalāteh-ye ‘Alī Zeynal; also known as Kalāteh-ye ‘Alī Zeynā) is a village in Dughayi Rural District, in the Central District of Quchan County, Razavi Khorasan Province, Iran. At the 2006 census, its population was 1,339, in 306 families.

References 

Populated places in Quchan County